The North Wall is a tidal defence wall which runs for several miles along the banks of the river Humber from Moody Lane in Grimsby along the coast to the offshore oil depot at Immingham. It has factories along one side.

Buildings and structures in Lincolnshire
Humber